The timeline for the war in Donbas is divided into the periods listed below:
Timeline of the war in Donbas (2014)
Timeline of the war in Donbas (2015)
Timeline of the war in Donbas (2016)
Timeline of the war in Donbas (2017)
Timeline of the war in Donbas (2018)
Timeline of the war in Donbas (2019)
Timeline of the war in Donbas (2020)
Timeline of the war in Donbas (2021)
Timeline of the war in Donbas (2022)

See also
 

 

Timelines of the Russo-Ukrainian War